Mishael Cheshin (‎; 16 February 1936 – 19 September 2015) was an Israeli Justice who served in the Supreme Court of Israel from 1992 to 2006.

Born in Beirut, Greater Lebanon, Cheshin was the son of Leah (née Margalit) and Shneor Zalman Cheshin. His father, born in Jerusalem, was a Justice of the Israeli Supreme Court, and his mother, born in Beirut to parents from Safed, the founding president of the Jerusalem Foundation. They had three children, one of them, Shneor, was killed in hit-and-run accident in 2010.

Cheshin studied law at the Hebrew University.

Prior to his appointment as a Supreme Court justice, Cheshin served 16 years in the Justice Ministry, culminating with a stint as deputy-attorney general from 1974–1978. He then entered private practice for 14 years, before being appointed to the Court. While serving as chairman of Israel's Central Election Commission, Cheshin suspended broadcasts of a press conference held by Prime Minister Ariel Sharon as a violation of election law. On 19 September 2015, Cheshin died at the age of 79 from cancer.

References

External links

1936 births
2015 deaths
Judges of the Supreme Court of Israel
Academic staff of Reichman University
Hebrew University of Jerusalem Faculty of Law alumni
Lebanese Jews